Dodia kononenkoi is a moth of the family Erebidae. It was described by Yuri A. Tshistjakov and J. Donald Lafontaine in 1984. It is found in the Russian Far East (Transbaikalia, Sikhote-Alin, Magadan) and Canada (Yukon Territory).

The forewings are even and translucent grey.

Subspecies
Dodia kononenkoi kononenkoi (Magadan region, Yukon territory)
Dodia kononenkoi sikhotensis Tshistjakov, 1988 (Primorye: Sikhote-Alin)

Dodia transbaikalensis was described as a subspecies of Dodia kononenkoi, but is now mostly treated as a full species.

References

Callimorphina
Moths described in 1984
Moths of North America